On June 30, 2022, gunmen ambushed Nigerian soldiers responding to a distress call of an attack on a mining village. Forty-eight people died, including thirty-four soldiers, eight policemen, and six civilians. The attack is one of the deadliest ambushes in Nigeria in recent years.

Background 

Since a 2009 uprising, militant Islamist organization Boko Haram has launched a guerrilla insurgency in northern Nigeria. While hostilities and the group's size has dwindled since 2021, attacks by bandits have increased in that same time. Throughout the summer and spring of 2022, bandit attacks on military outposts increased heavily. In January, three Chinese nationals were kidnapped from a hydroelectric power plant in Shiroro. Boko Haram had also allegedly formed a presence in Shiroro in early 2022, prior to the attacks. Just one day before, two police officers were killed in Enugu, in southeastern Nigeria.

Ambush and kidnapping 
On June 29, 2022, at 4pm local time, bandits on motorbikes and a truck kidnapped four Chinese nationals and other mine workers at Ajata-Aboki mine near Shiroro. The bandits immediately shot and killed seven policemen at the scene along with some civilians, and then proceeded to shoot sporadically to scare the remaining workers. Nigerian military forces stationed in the nearby village of Erena responded to a distress call at the mine, and as three trucks filled with servicemen departed towards the mine, the bandits ambushed them on motorbikes. State Commissioner for Internal Security Emmanuel Umar stated "the joint security team engaged the terrorists and there were a yet to be determined number of casualties from both sides." Initial estimates by the Nigerian military placed the death toll at 20 military personnel, along with seven police officers and "scores" of civilians, while Reuters stated that 30 security forces were killed immediately.  An eyewitness to the massacre and also the leader of local group Concerned Shiroro Youths of Niger State, Sani Abubakar Yusuf Kokki, stated that in the following days, the bodies of more servicemen and police officers from the ambush were discovered.

Aftermath 
Following the attack, Brigadier General Onyema Nwachukwu stated that Nigerian officials were "on the trail of the criminals, with some already neutralized". Niger State governor Abubakar Sani Bello demanded security agencies go "all out" to ensure the kidnapped victims are returned safely. The Ajata-Aboki mine was later reinforced with soldiers from the 1st Division.

References 

Nigerian bandit conflict
2022 in Nigeria
Attacks in Africa in 2022
Mass murder in 2022
Mass murder in Nigeria
Massacres in 2022
Massacres in Nigeria
Niger State
History of Niger State